John Austen Anstruther-Gough-Calthorpe (born 14 July 1947) is a property developer and former Chairman of the Watermark Group, son of Sir Richard Anstruther-Gough-Calthorpe, 2nd Baronet, and Nancy Moireach Malcolmson.

Personal life
He married twice. Firstly at the Kensington Register Office on 27 May 1977 to socialite, débutante and banking heiress Lady Mary-Gaye Georgiana Lorna Curzon, born on 21 February 1947, the daughter of the 6th Earl Howe, and former wife of Kevin Esmond Peter Cooper-Key, whom she married in 1971 and divorced in 1976 and by whom she had a daughter Pandora Lorna Mary Cooper-Key, born in 1973, who works at Vivienne Westwood. The couple divorced in 1986 and had three children:
 Georgiana Calthorpe (b. October 14, 1978) 
 Isabella Calthorpe (b. March 3, 1980) 
 Jacobi Richard Penn Anstruther-Gough-Calthorpe (b. May 10, 1983)

He married secondly in 1987 Vanessa Mary Teresa Llewellyn Hubbard (b. 21 February 1958), former wife of Sir David St Vincent Llewellyn, 4th Baronet,
With whom he had two daughters:
 Gabriella Wilde (b. April 8, 1989)
 Octavia Elsa Anstruther-Gough-Calthorpe (b. 1991)

See also
Anstruther-Gough-Calthorpe baronets
Anstruther baronets
Baron Calthorpe
Gough-Calthorpe family

References

External links
William Addams Reitwiesner. "Ancestry of Isabella Calthorpe"

1947 births
English businesspeople
Living people
Gough-Calthorpe family
Younger sons of baronets